is a professional motorcycle road racer who currently races in the MFJ All-Japan Road Race ST600 Championship and the Asia Road Race SS600 Championship, riding a Honda CBR600RR.

Career
Koyama was born in Sagamihara, Kanagawa, Japan. After competing in Grand Prix races as a wild card since 2000 – having been the champion of the MFJ All Japan Road Race GP125 Championship in 2000, and finished in the top five for three successive seasons in the MFJ All Japan Road Race GP250 Championship – Koyama joined the series full-time in 2005, with Ajo Motorsport. His best result of the season was 2nd at Phillip Island, and he also was best rookie of the season. 2006 wasn't as good for him, but after he moved to KTM in 2007, he scored his first victory at the 2007 Catalan motorcycle Grand Prix. 2008 was much less successful for both Koyama and KTM with a best place of 6th his only top 10 finish in the first 10 races. He ends the 2008 season with 7th at Valencia and 17th in the final standings, four places behind the most successful KTM rider (Marc Márquez) in an unsuccessful year for the Austrian concern. For 2009 Koyama joined the smaller Loncin team, alongside Alexis Masbou, and struggled to score points. In 2010 Koyama rode an RS Aprillia for Racing Team Germany. Koyama finished eighth in the championship, taking a best placing of second at the German Grand Prix at the Sachsenring.

After failing to find a full-time Grand Prix ride for the  season, he competed in both the Spanish Moto2 championship (where he finished third), and in the MFJ All Japan Road Race J-GP2 Championship, finishing eighth. Koyama also competed in three Grand Prix Moto2 races towards the end of the season; he replaced the injured Kenan Sofuoğlu at Misano and Aragón, as well as a wild-card appearance at Motegi, but failed to score points in any of the appearances. Koyama remained in the Spanish Moto2 championship in 2012, where he finished ninth overall. After Roberto Rolfo parted company with Technomag-CIP at Grand Prix level, Koyama completed the season with the team; in six races, he finished outside the points in them all.

Career statistics

Grand Prix motorcycle racing

By season

Races by year
(key) (Races in bold indicate pole position; races in italics indicate fastest lap)

References

External links

  

1983 births
Living people
People from Sagamihara
Japanese motorcycle racers
250cc World Championship riders
125cc World Championship riders
Moto2 World Championship riders